Holme Low is a civil parish in the Allerdale borough of Cumbria, United Kingdom. It borders the parishes of Holme St. Cuthbert and Holme Abbey to the south, the town of Silloth-on-Solway to the north-west, and has a short stretch of coastline on the Solway Firth to the west. To the north, it is bordered by lands common to Holme St. Cuthbert, Holme Low, and Holme Abbey, which is an unpopulated area. Holme Low had a population of 373 in 137 households at the 2001 census, reducing slightly in the 2011 Census to a population of 362 in 162 households.

The parish is entirely rural, and the population is scattered in small hamlets. Holme Low includes the hamlets of Barracks Bridge, Blackdyke, Blitterlees, Calvo, Causewayhead, Greenrow, Seaville and Wolsty. There are bus services available in the parish, with several Silloth-bound routes passing through or close by. The number 60 from Silloth runs every two hours to Maryport along the B5300 coast road, and stops at Blitterlees, Beckfoot, Mawbray, and Allonby. The 38 runs to Carlisle via Abbeytown, and the 71 runs to Carlisle via Newton Arlosh and Kirkbride, ensuring that residents of the parish have links to Cumbria's county town.

History
Holme Low became a separate parish in 1845, after St. Paul's church was constructed in Causewayhead, and was known as Low Holme or Holme St. Paul's. It had previously been part of the parish of Holme Cultram (which is now the civil parish of Holme Abbey, centred on Abbeytown). In the mid-late 19th century, the parish of Holme Low also included the town of Silloth (described in an 1868 survey as a "hamlet"), as well as Skinburness and other areas which are now part of the civil parish of Silloth-on-Solway.

However, the parish's history can be traced back even further. In Roman times, when the entire Solway coast was fortified to defend against incursions across the sea, a series of milefortlets were constructed beyond the western end of Hadrian's Wall. Remains of one of these have been discovered near Beckfoot, just beyond the parish's southern boundary. A Roman road also ran through the parish at that time.

In the early 14th century, a castle was built at Wolsty to defend Holme Cultram Abbey from attacks by Scots, who would frequently raid across the Solway. Not much remains of the castle today; it was already in a ruined state by 1572, and had been entirely demolished by the 18th century.

From 1862 until the Beeching Axe in the 1960s, the Carlisle and Silloth Bay railway line ran through Holme Low. Within the parish itself there was a single station, Blackdyke Halt, which closed with the rest of the line in the 1960s. In 1954, this line was the first in Britain to replace its steam locomotives with diesel ones, so for a short while, Holme Low was one of the only places in the country to see diesel-fuelled trains.

The parish council

Holme Low Parish Council usually meets four times a year, once per quarter, in February, May, August, and November. Meetings are open to the public, and the county councillor responsible for the parish and representatives of the local police force are invited to attend.

Parish councils in England have certain duties and responsibilities to the communities they serve, and Holme Low is no exception. The council is responsible for liaising with Cumbria County Council on a variety of issues which affect residents, including highways, footpaths and bridleways, public transportation, and planning applications. It is also responsible for its own budget and assets, and communicating with Cumbria Constabulary on policing issues within the parish. Holme Low Parish Council also maintains a website with detailed minutes of meetings and financial information, all of which is freely available to residents of the parish.

See also

Listed buildings in Holme Low

References

External links
 Cumbria County History Trust: Holme Low (nb: provisional research only – see Talk page)

Civil parishes in Cumbria
Allerdale